Hiram Barton (1810–1880) was mayor of the city of Buffalo, New York, serving 1849–1850 and 1852–1853.  He was born in Hebron, New York on May 20, 1810. He attended Middlebury College in Vermont, where he studied law. He moved to Buffalo in 1835 and formed a law partnership.  In 1840, he married Lucy Ann Clark of Buffalo.

In 1843 Barton was elected alderman of the Third Ward, and again in 1844. He was elected as the Whig choice for Mayor on March 7, 1849. During his first term, cholera returned to the city and nearly ten percent of the population was stricken and three per cent died within a period of four and a half months. The city charter was changed to make the term of elected aldermen to two years instead of one. He did not seek a second term in 1850. He was elected on March 2, 1852, to his second term; the last time the Whigs triumphed in Buffalo  His second term ended on March 8, 1853.

He resumed his law practice until about 1875, when he retired. Barton died on February 10, 1880, and was buried in Forest Lawn Cemetery.

Hiram's wife, Lucy, died at her home in Franklin Street, Buffalo on 10 June 1881.

References

1810 births
1880 deaths
New York (state) Whigs
19th-century American politicians
New York (state) city council members
Mayors of Buffalo, New York
Burials at Forest Lawn Cemetery (Buffalo)
People from Hebron, New York
Middlebury College alumni